3,4-Dimethoxy-N-methylamphetamine (DMMA) is a psychoactive drug and research chemical of the phenethylamine and amphetamine chemical classes. It appears to act as a serotonin–norepinephrine–dopamine releasing agent (SNDRA), although it is significantly less potent than MDMA.

References 

Serotonin-norepinephrine-dopamine releasing agents
Methamphetamines